Chrysocercops squamosa is a moth of the family Gracillariidae. It is known from Johor and Pahang, Malaysia.

The wingspan is 5.0–6.2 mm.

The larvae feed on Vatica pallida and Vatica pauciflora. They mine the leaves of their host plant.

References

Chrysocercops
Moths described in 1992